Rupa Lake or Rupa Tal is a freshwater lake in Nepal located in the border of Pokhara Metropolitan and Rupa Rural Municipality of Kaski District. The lake is elongated north to south and is fed by perennial streams. Its watershed area is 30 km2, where The main inflow of water is from Talbesi stream, whereas Dhovan khola is the feeder stream with its outlet Tal khola at Sistani ghat. It supports a number of floral and faunal species. A total of 36 species of waterbirds have been recorded in the lake which represents about 19 percent of the total 193 wetland-dependent birds found in Nepal.

Lake Economy
Rupa lake is the one of main tourism attraction among Begnas Lake of the Pokhara city. It provides enough space for boating experiences for national and international visitors. Cage culture as well as pen culture have been practiced in Rupa lake for fish farming. Farmers in the Kaski district of Nepal have formed the Rupa Lake Rehabilitation and Fisheries Cooperatives Limited to help protect the watershed.

See also
Rara Lake
List of Nepal-related topics
Annapurna
Dhaulagiri
List of lakes of Nepal

References

External links

Lakes of Gandaki Province